The 2021 ADAC GT Masters was the fifteenth season of the ADAC GT Masters, the grand tourer-style sports car racing founded by the German automobile club ADAC.

Montaplast drivers Ricardo Feller and Christopher Mies won the title in a closely-fought battle with SSR Performance's Michael Ammermüller and Mathieu Jaminet.

Calendar 

The round at Nürburgring planned in 6-7 August was postponed after massive flooding in Germany. The new date was set to 6-7 November, making it the series finale.

Entry list

Race results

Championship standings

Points system 
Points were awarded to the top 15 classified finishers in each race.

Drivers' standings

References

External links

ADAC GT Masters seasons
ADAC GT Masters